Evans Landing is a rural locality in the Weipa Town, Queensland, Australia. In the  Evans Landing had a population of 62 people.

Geography 
Albatross Bay bounds the locality to the south. 

Approximately half of the land at Evans Landing is used for industrial purposes while the remainder is undeveloped.

History 
The locality is named after geologist Harry Evans, who found the bauxite deposits in the Weipa area for Consolidated Zinc Corporation.

In the  Evans Landing had a population of 62 people.

Facilities 
Weipa SES Facility is on Kerr Point Drive.

Amenities 
There is a public boat ramp and pontoon on Landing Drive. It is managed by the North Queensland Bulk Ports.

There is a park beside the SES Facility on Kerr Point Drive.

References 

Weipa Town
Coastline of Queensland
Localities in Queensland